Summerfield Schools is a public school district in Petersburg, Michigan.  The district includes all of Summerfield Township, as well as a small portion of neighboring Dundee and Ida townships.

Schools

Elementary schools
Summerfield Elementary School

Secondary schools
Summerfield Junior/Senior High School

References

External links

Summerfield Schools

School districts in Michigan
Education in Monroe County, Michigan